Friedrich von Wendt (28 September 1738 in Sorau – 24 September 1818 in Erlangen) was a German physician.

He studied medicine at the Universities of Halle and Göttingen, earning his doctorate at the latter institution in 1762. Following graduation he successively worked as a physician in the town of Genthin, served as a Stadtphysicus in Pless (Upper Silesia) and was a personal physician to the Prince of Anhalt. In 1778 he was appointed professor of medicine at the University of Erlangen, where he founded a clinical institute later the same year.

In 1808–09 he published the journal "Annalen des Klinischen Instituts auf der Akademie zu Erlangen". From 1811 to 1818 he was president of the Deutsche Akademie der Naturforscher Leopoldina.

Selected published works 
 "Historia tracheotomiae nuperrime administratae", 1774.
 "De febribus remittentibus semestris hiberni ann. MDCCXCV-XCVI commentatio", 1796.
 "Formvlae Medicamentorvm in Institvto Clinico Erlangensi Vsitatorum", 1807.

References 

1738 births
1818 deaths
Academic staff of the University of Erlangen-Nuremberg
University of Göttingen alumni
University of Halle alumni
18th-century German physicians
People from Żary